This is a list of awards and nominations received by Marília Mendonça, a Brazilian singer. She had been active from 2011, when she was 16, up until her death in 2021.

Awards and nominations

References

Mendonca, Marilia